Harold Desbrowe-Annear (16 August 1865 – 22 June 1933) was an influential Australian architect who was at the forefront of the development of the Arts and Crafts movement in the country. During the 1890s he was an instructor in architecture at the Working Men's College (now RMIT University) where he founded the T-Square in 1900. The club acted as a meeting point for Melbourne's architects, artists and craft workers and helped to develop a strong Arts and Crafts culture in the city. Desbrowe-Annear was also a supporter of the Victorian Arts and Crafts Society, founded in 1908.

Personal life

Early life and education
Born in Happy Valley, Bendigo, Victoria in 1865, Desbrowe-Annear was the elder son of James Annear, mining contractor, and Eliza Ann (née Hawkins). He had six older stepsisters, two sisters and a brother. After the family moved to Melbourne in 1875 Desbrowe-Annear attended Hawthorn Grammar School, matriculating in 1882. On 25 July 1891, he married Florence Susan Chadwick but by the end of World War I, due to irreconcilable differences, they had separated.

Practices
In 1883, Desbrowe-Annear was articled to Melbourne architect William Salway and during this time his interest and knowledge of architecture grew extensively. In 1889 he chose to pursue a practice of his own having already received recognition for his architectural sketches and papers delivered to the Victorian Institute of Architects. During the 1890s he became an advocate of the Arts and Crafts movement and he established the T-Square Club on an Arts and Crafts agenda of collaborative work and the promotion of the building crafts. He was sympathetic to the theory of a 'democratic architecture' which underpins his most recognised work, the Eaglemont houses (1903) as well as his journal For Every Man his Home (1922) which expressed the idea of domestic Australian architecture suitable for everyone.

Death
Desbrowe-Annear died on 22 June 1933 of heart disease; he was survived by Florence, whom he had not divorced, and their two sons James and Hector.

The Harold Desbrowe-Annear Award
In 1996, The Royal Australian Institute of Architects introduced the Harold Desbrowe-Annear Award to the best residential project of the year in Victoria. It is the highest honour in the state for Residential Architecture.

Notable projects

Federation Arch, Princes Bridge 1901
The ephemeral triumphal arch erected on Princes Bridge by the City of Melbourne was designed by Desbrowe-Annear in 1901 to mark the visit of the Duke and Duchess of York for the Federation celebrations. It was influenced by Beaux-Arts civic design and the 'Arc de Triomphe' in Paris.

Chadwick Houses, Eaglemont 1903
The three houses that Desbrowe-Annear erected in Eaglemont were commissioned by his father-in-law James Chadwick in 1903. They were 36–38 The Eyrie, built as a residence for the architect and his family; 32–34 The Eyrie, known as Chadwick House and 55 Outlook Drive, known as the Officer House. While relatively modest in size, their design indicates that the architect was prepared to grasp the issue of the "small home" as one of the most challenging of the 20th century. They embody the principles of William Morris in their truth to materials and place, structural 'honesty', functionalism and celebration of the builder's craft. They are weatherboard with rough cast and half-timbering and exhibit many technological innovations including wall recessed, sliding window sashes, modular wall-framing and convection heating vents to fireplaces. Each house was thoughtfully positioned on the slope of the hill, with increasing setbacks from the street, so as not to block the views from within.

Springthorpe Memorial, Booroondara Cemetery, Kew, 1897–1900

The Springthorpe Memorial in the Boroondara Cemetery, Kew, was Desbrowe-Annear's first Arts and Crafts venture. The design was influenced by William Lethaby's writings on the iconography of the domed temple form in "Architecture: Mysticism & Myth". Consequentially the architecture is symbolic. The geographic alignment of the tomb ascertains that the intense light of the afternoon sun lights up the temple with brilliant colour. It explores the idea of the hoped-for union of souls.

Inglesby, South Yarra 1915
Inglesby, also called the Francis house, in South Yarra was one of Desbrowe-Annear's most famous houses, identified by Robin Boyd as an example of Melbourne's 'pioneer modernism'. It was timber-framed with plain white roughcast walls inspired by Californian architect Irving Gill. The plan of Inglesby centred on a large hall entered from the porch. It was flanked either side by the dining room and the living room accessed through sliding doors which when opened extended into a huge living area across the front of the house. Inglesby's low ceilings and horizontal flow aligned it also to the work of Frank Lloyd Wright.

Heritage listed residential houses
Allanvale, Allanvale Road, Great Western, Northern Grampians Shire. Allanvale Homestead off the Allanvale Tuckershill Road at Great Western, has significance as a moderately intact example of a 19th-century sheep station.
Annear House – 36–38 The Eyrie Heidelberg, Banyule City. Substantially intact, 36–38 The Eyrie is one of three houses constructed on the Eaglemont Estate.
Beleura – 42–44 Kalimna Drive Mornington, Mornington Peninsula Shire. Erected by James Butchart between c.1860 and c.1865, Beleura is one of several stately homes constructed as summer retreats along the Mornington Peninsula.
The Chadwick House – 32–34 The Eyrie Heidelberg, Banyule City. Substantially intact, 32–34 The Eyrie is one of three houses constructed on the Eaglemont Estate. Chadwick House was built in 1903 by the architect Harold Desbrowe Annear for his father-in-law, James Chadwick.
Cranlana – 62 Clendon Road Toorak, Stonnington City. The property known as Cranlana and garden was developed by the businessman and philanthropist Sidney Myer and his wife Dame Merlyn Myer.
Cruden Farm – Murdoch House, Cranhaven Road, Langwarrin, Frankston. After his marriage to Elisabeth Greene, Rupert Murdoch commissioned Desbrowe-Annear to enlarge and modernise the original Edwardian house. The renovation far exceeded the brief.
Delgany – 3809–3819 Point Nepean Road And Delgany Avenue Portsea, Mornington Peninsula Shire. This is a large limestone building with prominent castellated parapets and towers.
Desbrowe Annear House  – 38 The Eyrie Eaglemont, Banyule City
East View – 16 Martin Street Heidelberg, Banyule City is a medium-sized residence built on two levels that utilise the fall of the land.
House – 234 Rosanna Road Rosanna. Of considerable architectural significance and it is externally largely intact.
Katanga – 372 Glenferrie Road Malvern, Stonnington City. Built for Mr Wesley Ince and his wife between 1931 – 1933, just before the death of its architect Harold Desbrowe Annear.
Longacres – 15 Range Road Olinda, Yarra Ranges Shire. Longacres constitutes a house and gallery, a painting studio, a caretakers residence and several outbuildings arranged in an informal garden on approximately 5 acres of land.
Macgeorge House – 25 Riverside Road Ivanhoe, Banyule City. Built in 1911, the Macgeorge House is a substantial bungalow (also known as Fairy Hills) and is situated at the intersection of the Yarra River and Darebin Creek in Ivanhoe. This building, originally "Ballangeich", was the home of prominent artist and critic Norman Macgeorge
Mulberry Hill – 385 Golf Links Road Langwarrin South, Frankston City. Mulberry Hill is remembered as the home of Sir Daryl (1889–1976) and Joan Lindsay (died 1984) and as a place frequented by other members of the famous Lindsay family.
Peroomba House – 80–82 Castle Street Heidelberg, Banyule City. Peroomba is a typical though not as distinguished example of the Arts and Crafts style of prominent architect Harold Desbrowe Annear.
Residence – 55 Outlook Drive Eaglemont – 55 Outlook Drive Eaglemont, Banyule City. Built in 1903, often referred to as the Officer House, is a residence designed by Harold Desbrowe Annear.
Springdale – 190 Gwyther Siding Road Leongatha South, South Gippsland Shire. The former Martin residence, designed by H Desbrowe Annear and constructed in 1905.
Tintern – 10 Tintern Avenue Toorak, Stonnington City. Tintern is a single storey mansion erected in 1855 for William Westgarth. The oldest part of the house is a ten-room portable iron dwelling, manufactured by W. and P. McLellan.
Westerfield – 72–118 Robinsons Road Frankston South, Frankston City. Westerfield was a  property purchased in 1920 by Russell and Mabel Grimwade as a farm and rural retreat, in an area which became popular in the 1920s for the holiday houses.

References

Selected bibliography
Harold Desbrowe-Annear 1865–1933: a life in architecture; Edquist, Harriet, The Miegunyah Press (Melbourne 2004)
S. U. Smith and B. Stevens (eds), Domestic Architecture in Australia (Syd, 1919)
R. Boyd, Victorian Modern (Melb, 1947), and Australia's Home (Melb, 1952)
G. Woodful, 'Harold Desbrowe Annear ...’, Architecture in Australia, February 1967
Australian Builder and Contractors' News, January 1888, June 1894
Building and Engineering Journal, July 1893
Punch (Melbourne), 9 July 1925
Argus (Melbourne), 23 June 1933.

External links
 Architecture of Harold Desbrowe-Annear
 Architect Harold Desbrowe-Annear
'

Architects from Melbourne
Arts and Crafts movement
Arts and Crafts architects
1865 births
1933 deaths
Australian people of Cornish descent
People from Bendigo
Academic staff of RMIT University
Federation architects